Pärnu Town Hall is a building in Pärnu, Estonia. 

The building is composed of two parts: classicist part at Uus Street, and the annex, which was built in 1911.

The town council started to work in the building in 1839.

Nowadays, the building is used by Pärnu City Gallery, Pärny City Orchestra and Pärnu Visiting Centre.

References

Buildings and structures in Pärnu
City and town halls in Estonia